The Bill Engvall Show is a sitcom which ran on TBS from July 17, 2007 to September 5, 2009. The series starred comedian Bill Engvall and was written and created by Engvall and Michael Leeson. The series was canceled on September 25, 2009.

Set in suburban Louisville, Colorado, Engvall played a family counselor called Bill Pearson who cannot always understand his own family. Nancy Travis co-starred as his wife and Tim Meadows played his best friend. The Pearson children were portrayed by Jennifer Lawrence, Graham Patrick Martin, and Skyler Gisondo.

Plot 

The show focuses on parenting issues like allowance controversies, driver's licenses, parking tickets and larger issues like raising responsible children. The Pearsons also try to keep the spark alive in their marriage and balance work with family life.

Teenage daughter Lauren (Lawrence) is the oldest child, a high-school girl dealing with classes and dating. Trent (Martin) is the middle child, dim but affable. Bryan (Gisondo) is the youngest and the "brainiac" of the family.

Bill works in the same building as his closest friend, Paul Dufrayne (Meadows). Paul is a hair-replacement specialist who is treated like part of the Pearson family (the kids refer to him as 'Uncle Paul').

Characters

Episodes

Series overview

Season 1 (2007)

Season 2 (2008)

Season 3 (2009)

International broadcasters
 Nine Network Primary Channel – Australia
 Super Channel – Canada
 Kanal 7 – Denmark
 TV1 – Lithuania
 Dubai One – Middle East and North Africa
 TV2 – New Zealand
 TVNorge – Norway
 TV Slovenija 2 – Slovenia
 TV3 – Sweden
 Novyi Kanal – Ukraine

Home media
The first season of The Bill Engvall Show was released on DVD on May 20, 2008. Bonus features include an overview of the show, a set tour, interviews with the cast and an "Ask Bill" segment. Beginning January 22, 2013, Warner Archive released seasons 2 & 3 together in one set, completing the series on DVD.

References

External links 

 

2007 American television series debuts
2009 American television series endings
2000s American sitcoms
English-language television shows
TBS (American TV channel) original programming
Television shows set in Colorado
Television series about families
Television series by Studio T